George Alvin "Bingo" Binks (born Binkowsky; July 11, 1914 – November 13, 2010) was an American professional baseball outfielder who played in Major League Baseball (MLB) for the Washington Senators, Philadelphia Athletics and St. Louis Browns.

Binks' professional career began in 1936 at the Class D level of minor league baseball. After missing the wartime years of 1942–1943, he joined the 1944 Milwaukee Brewers of the top-level American Association and batted a lofty .374 in an even 100 games played. He reached the majors that September with the Senators, spending all or parts of three years (–) with them before moving to the Athletics of Connie Mack (–) and the Browns (1948).

Over five MLB seasons, Binks was a .253 hitter (277–for–1,093) with eight home runs and 130 RBI in 351 games, including 112 runs, 55 doubles, 10 triples, and 21 stolen bases. His professional baseball career ended in 1950 after 13 seasons.

References

External links

George Binks

1914 births
2010 deaths
Baltimore Orioles (IL) players
Baseball players from Chicago
Buffalo Bisons (minor league) players
Cedar Rapids Raiders players
Charleston Senators players
Green Bay Blue Sox players
Madison Blues players
Major League Baseball outfielders
Milwaukee Brewers (minor league) players
Monessen Indians players
Owensboro Oilers players
Philadelphia Athletics players
St. Louis Browns players
Springfield Indians players
Toledo Mud Hens players
Tyler Trojans players
Washington Senators (1901–1960) players
Wilkes-Barre Barons players